Hot Shots! Part Deux is a 1993 American parody film directed by Jim Abrahams. It stars Charlie Sheen, Lloyd Bridges, Valeria Golino, Richard Crenna (parodying his Colonel role in the Rambo franchise), Brenda Bakke, Miguel Ferrer, Rowan Atkinson, and Jerry Haleva. Sheen, who portrays a spoof of John Rambo, went through a tough weight lifting/training program to gain the physique needed to play the role of an action hero. A sequel to Hot Shots! (1991) and the second installment in the Hot Shots franchise, the movie primarily spoofs the 1980s action films Rambo: First Blood Part II (1985) and Rambo III (1988).

Abrahams and Pat Proft wrote the screenplay. Members of both men's families have roles as extras.

Plot
One night, an American special forces team invades Saddam Hussein's palace and a nearby prison camp to rescue captured soldiers from Operation Desert Storm and to assassinate Saddam, but they find the Iraqis waiting for them, and the entire rescue team is captured. This failed operation turns out to be the latest in a series of rescue attempts which were foiled by the Iraqis, and consequently the advisors of President Benson suspect a mole in their own ranks. Colonel Denton Walters suggests that they gain the support of war hero Topper Harley for the next mission, but Topper has retired from the United States Navy and become a reclusive Buddhist in a small Thai village. Walters and Michelle Huddleston, CIA, arrive and try to persuade him out of retirement in order to rescue the imprisoned soldiers and the previous rescue parties.

Topper initially refuses, but when yet another rescue mission (this one, in turn, led by Walters) fails, he agrees to lead a small group of soldiers into Iraq. He is joined by Harbinger, Williams, and Rabinowitz, the sole escapee of the prior rescue mission and whom Topper suspects to be the mysterious saboteur. They parachute into an Iraqi jungle close to the heavily guarded hostage camp and set off to meet their contact, who turns out to be Topper's ex-girlfriend, Ramada. Ramada guides them to a fishing boat that she prepared for their transportation. As they move towards the camp, she and Topper reminisce, and she explains that she was married before she met him. When she was informed that her husband, Dexter, was still alive and a prisoner in Iraq, she volunteered to participate in his rescue, but was instructed to keep this strictly confidential, forcing her to break up with Topper just as they were preparing to elope; this also led to Topper's decision to retire from the Navy.

Topper's team proceeds to the prison camp disguised as river fishermen, but a confrontation with an Iraqi patrol boat defeats them. When President Benson hears of the apparent demise of another mission, he decides to help the fight and joins additional forces in Iraq. However, Topper and his teammates have survived, and soon reach the Iraqi hostage camp. In the course of the operation, the alarm is raised and a gunfight ensues, during which Topper finds out that Harbinger is not the saboteur, but has merely lost self-confidence in fighting, and manages to inspire him. After the prisoners are freed, Topper goes back to free Dexter, who is imprisoned in Saddam's palace.

While the squad evacuates the hostages, Topper enters Saddam's palace and encounters the dictator himself, who pulls out his machine pistol and commands Topper to surrender. Topper overpowers Saddam, and they engage in a sword fight. President Benson arrives and orders Topper to rescue Dexter while Benson and Saddam continue the duel. Benson defeats Saddam by spraying him with a fire extinguisher, upon which he and his dog freeze and crack into pieces, only to subsequently melt, combine and reform as Saddam with his dog's head, fur, nose and ears. In the meantime, Topper manages to find Dexter, but is forced to carry him out on his shoulders as the Iraqis have tied Dexter's shoelaces together.

The squad heads back to the army helicopter, where Ramada, after an intense revelation involving unfounded jealousy, reveals and arrests Michelle as the saboteur who betrayed the previous rescue attempts to the Iraqis. Dexter arrives with Topper and insists on taking a picture of him and Ramada, but backs away too far and falls over a cliff. President Benson joins the escapees, and the evacuation team lifts off; Saddam is about to shoot down the chopper when Topper and Ramada get rid of extra weight in it by pushing a piano out the open door, which crushes him. Reunited, Topper and Ramada kiss as they fly off into the sunset.

Cast

Reception

Reviews for Hot Shots! Part Deux were mixed. Rotten Tomatoes gives a score of 58% based on reviews from 33 critics with the consensus stating, "Audiences who enjoyed the first Hot Shots! will probably get tickled by this second helping, although the barrage of laughs miss more than they hit this time around".

Roger Ebert noted that the film references such movies as Rambo III, Lady and the Tramp and Apocalypse Now, as well as the fairy tale Goldilocks and the Three Bears. Ebert concluded, "Movies like this are more or less impervious to the depredations of movie critics. Either you laugh, or you don't. I laughed."

The film became a financial success at the box office in 1993, grossing over $130 million worldwide.

Mockumentary promotion
As part of the film's promotion, a mockumentary was aired on HBO. Titled Hearts of Hot Shots! Part Deux—A Filmmaker's Apology, the mockumentary parodied Hearts of Darkness: A Filmmaker's Apocalypse, the 1991 documentary about the making of the film Apocalypse Now (which starred Charlie Sheen's father, Martin Sheen). Martin and Charlie Sheen briefly encounter each other in a scene in the main movie, parodying Apocalypse Now and Platoon, where they pass each other in PBR vessels along a river, and shout across to each other, "I loved you in Wall Street!".

References

External links
 
 

1993 films
1990s parody films
American parody films
American sequel films
Military humor in film
Films about the United States Army
Films scored by Basil Poledouris
Films directed by Jim Abrahams
Films set in Iraq
Films set in Thailand
Cultural depictions of Saddam Hussein
Films with screenplays by Jim Abrahams
Films with screenplays by Pat Proft
20th Century Fox films
American slapstick comedy films
1993 comedy films
1990s English-language films
1990s American films